Many Happy Returns is an American sitcom that ran on CBS for twenty-six episodes, from September 21, 1964 to April 12, 1965. General Foods sponsored it from 9:30 to 10 Eastern Time on Monday nights.

Personnel
The show starred John McGiver as widower Walter Burnley, the manager of the Adjustments and Refunds Department at the fictitious Krockmeyer's Department Store in Los Angeles. Elinor Donahue played Burnley's daughter, Joan Randall. Mark Goddard played Joan's husband, Bob Randall.  The Randalls' daughter, Laurie, was played by Andrea Sacino.

Elena Verdugo played complaint department employee Lynn Hall, with Richard Collier as Harry Price, Jesslyn Fax as Wilma Fritter, and Mickey Manners as Joe Foley, all store employees. Doris Packer played Cornelia. Russell Collins was cast as Burnley's demanding, often unreasonable boss, Owen Sharp.

Parke Levy was the program's creator and executive producer. Directors included Theodore J. Flicker, Stanley Z. Cherry, and Sherman Marks. Writers included Earl Barret, Hannibal Coons, Sid Dorfman, Phil Green, Harvey Helm, Albert E. Lewin, Norman Paul, and Harry Winkler.

David Rose and Levy composed the show's theme.

Production 
Many Happy Returns was produced by MGM Studios and Lindabob Productions. Episodes were filmed in black-and-white with a laugh track.

Episodes

History
Many Happy Returns ran opposite The Bing Crosby Show on ABC and The Andy Williams Show on NBC It was replaced by reruns of The Danny Thomas Show.

See also
1964-65 United States network television schedule

References

External links 
 

1960s American sitcoms
1960s American workplace comedy television series
1964 American television series debuts
1965 American television series endings
CBS original programming
Television shows set in Los Angeles
Black-and-white American television shows
Department stores in fiction
English-language television shows
Television series by MGM Television
Television series set in shops